"It Happens" is a song co-written and recorded by American country music duo Sugarland.  It was released in February 2009 as the third single from their album Love on the Inside.  The duo's members, Jennifer Nettles and Kristian Bush, wrote the song along with Bobby Pinson, with whom the duo also co-wrote the album's first two singles, "All I Want to Do" and "Already Gone". To date, this is Sugarland’s last number one song.

Content
"It Happens" is an up-tempo accompanied by steel-string acoustic guitar and electric guitar. In it, the female narrator (Jennifer Nettles, the duo's lead singer) tells of oversleeping and coming to work late. She borrows her neighbor's car to drive to "Wally World" in the second verse, and is involved in an accident with her ex and his new girlfriend. A "Pssh" sound precedes the phrase "It happens" on all but the second chorus, so as to make the phrase sound like "shit happens".

Critical reception
In his review of the album, Entertainment Weekly critic Chris Willman said that the song recalled "cheekily potty-mouthed hits like Blake Shelton's 'Some Beach'." Thom Jurek of Allmusic cited the song as an example of the album's personal influence, as Nettles had gone through a divorce while writing it. Matt Bjorke described the song favorably as well in his review for the Roughstock website. He called it "a playful, irreverent song" and considered it a better single choice than "Love" (which was originally slated as the album's third single), because he thought that "It Happens" showed a more traditionally country sound than "Love" did.

Matt C., in his review of the album for Engine 145, said that Nettles seemed to show more interest in "frivolous tracks" such as "It Happens" as compared to the more serious tracks. Country Universe critic Blake Boldt gave it a C rating, saying that it was a "needless novelty" but a "necessary evil in a corporate radio world".

Awards
"It Happens" was nominated at the 52nd Grammy Awards for Best Country Performance by a Duo or Group, but lost to Lady Antebellum's "I Run to You."

Personnel
The following musicians play on this track.
Brandon Bush – Hammond B-3 organ
Kristian Bush – acoustic guitar, background vocals
Paul Bushnell – bass guitar
Dan Dugmore – acoustic guitar
Shannon Forrest – drums, percussion
Michael Landau – electric guitar
Jennifer Nettles – lead vocals, background vocals

Chart performance
"It Happens" debuted at #40 on the Billboard Hot Country Songs charts dated for February 28, 2009. The song became the duo's fifth  U.S. Number One song on the chart week of May 23, 2009, holding that position for two weeks.

Year-end charts

References

2009 singles
2008 songs
Sugarland songs
Novelty songs
Songs written by Bobby Pinson
Songs written by Kristian Bush
Songs written by Jennifer Nettles
Song recordings produced by Byron Gallimore
Mercury Nashville singles